Anthene gemmifera, the jewelled ciliate blue, is a butterfly in the family Lycaenidae. It is found in Sierra Leone, Ghana, Cameroon, Ethiopia, Uganda, south-western Kenya and along the coast, Tanzania and Zambia. The habitat consists of the forest/savanna transition zone and deciduous woodland.

Adult males mud-puddle.

References

Butterflies described in 1910
Anthene